Gina Bold is an English artist/poet, who makes paintings, stained glass and sculpture. She was an artist in residence at Arlington House from May to November 2007.

Life and work 

Gina Bold was born in London to a Greek mother and Scottish father and lived in Abbey Road, London. She studied fashion at Kilburn Polytechnic and pattern cutting. She started painting in 1987 with the encouragement of personal friend Shaun Parry-Jones. In 1993, she attended the Mary Ward Center and learned how to make stained glass windows. She started to make small sculptures in 2006. She was exhibited for the first time in 2002 by Barnet College and also at the Stuckism International Gallery.

In 2007, she held her first solo show, Born to Be Bold, at the Arlington Gallery in Camden Town, London. the show consisted of 67 paintings and 10 sculptures.

Shows 

2002: Barnet college end of term show
2002: The First Stuckist International (guest artist)
2002: F-EST
2003: Art4All, Prince's Trust.
2003: Kith and Kids charity show
2003: Stuck in Wednesbury (guest artist)
2004: The Clifton, St Johns Wood, London, solo show
2004: ODPM with Vision Impossible (group show)
2005: Bull and Last, Highgate Road (solo show)
2007: Born to Be Bold (solo)
2007: The Other Side Gallery Christmas fair, Novas Gallery (group show)
2008: Spirit of Arlington: (group show)
2009: A Bite of Bold: (solo show)
2009: Bold in the Basement: (solo show)
2009: Bold 'n' Blue: (solo show) Charlotte Street Blues, London
2009: Outside In: (group show)Pallent House Gallery, Chichester

References 

"Biog", ginabold.com. Retrieved 2007-07-29.
Buckman, David (2006), "Dictionary of Artists in Britain since 1945", page 158. Art Dictionaries, Bristol. 
McArdle, Peter, "Gina Bold", stuckism.com. Retrieved 2007-07-29.
Milner, Frank (Editor) (2004), The Stuckists Punk Victorian, National Museums Liverpool, . An essay from the book is online at "A Stuckist on Stuckism".
Thomson, Charles (2007), "Stuck Inn II. Part two: Gina - Getting into the Gallery", 2004-04-07. Retrieved 2007-06-24.
Wroe, Simon (2007),  "Bold Strokes From Gina". Camden New Journal 2007-02-22. Retrieved 2007-06-21.

External links 

 Gina Bold web site
 Review of Born to Be Bold
 Discussion of Gina Bold's work

1959 births
Living people
20th-century English painters
21st-century English painters
20th-century English women artists
21st-century English women artists
Artists from London
British contemporary painters
English contemporary artists
English women painters